The San Francisco Model Yacht Club (SFMYC) is dedicated to the hobby, arts, and sport of building and racing working model boats of all descriptions. A California-incorporated 501(c)(7) non-profit, social/recreational corporation, it is anchored by the Spreckels Lake Model Yacht Facility in Golden Gate Park, which includes the lake itself and the SFMYC's WPA-era Clubhouse. The club draws its membership, which varies annually between 120 and 160, from throughout northern and central-coastal California, as well as nationally and overseas.

The San Francisco Model Yacht Club is a historically significant club because it was at the request of this group that Spreckels Lake was created by the San Francisco Parks Commission between 1902 and 1904 as a lake dedicated specifically for model boat sailing and competition. The Parks Commission built the club's first clubhouse in 1909 from the remnants of the ‘little’ St. Francis Hotel near the Polo Fields and assisted when the SFMYC raised the funds via private subscription for the Works Progress Administration (WPA) to build the current clubhouse closer to Spreckels Lake at the 'corner' of JFK Drive and 36th Ave in the late 1930s, using funds raised by the model yacht club itself with some additional funding from San Francisco. After completion in 1938, the federal government, via charter, deeded the clubhouse in perpetuity to the Model Yacht Club.

The San Francisco Model Yacht Club has always been part of the history of the lake and model yacht facility, and it can be said that neither could exist without the other.

Founded in 1898, the club coalesced from a group of affiliated model boating enthusiasts, including a number of socially-prominent and wealthy San Franciscans.  Originally home-ported at Golden Gate Park's Stow Lake, it is now the oldest, continuously operating model boating organization in the western hemisphere. Although other model boat clubs were formed prior to the SFMYC, such as the seminal Prospect Park Model Yacht Club in Brooklyn, New York, founded in 1872, none survived continuously to the present.

Locations

Spreckels Lake Model Yacht Facility, Golden Gate Park
Primary operating waters for all Squadrons including the Clubhouse.
San Pablo Dam
Back-up operating area for members of the R/C Sail Squadron who live in the east bay.

Affiliations

American Model Yacht Association (AMYA) – Member club

North American Model Boat Association (NAMBA) – Charter member, withdrew in the mid-1980s due to legal issue

The Spreckels Lake "Irregulars" – A loosely self-affiliated group of friends, mainly radio-controlled model power boat hobbyists, who have regularly run their boats and craft on Spreckels Lake for many years but who, for a variety of reasons, choose not to become official members of SFMYC. Some have won numerous awards in club competitions when they are open to non-members.

See also
 Radio-controlled boat
 Model yachting

References

External links
San Francisco Recreation & Parks Department
Golden Gate Park
The San Francisco Model Yacht Club
The American Model Yacht Association
The North American Model Boat Association
The "On Spreckels Lake" Thread on RCGroups.Com (A modeling community thread regarding Spreckels Lake.)

Media Links/Stories
 Mini-yachts race on Spreckels Lake, Carl Nolte, SF Chronicle, Monday, October 8, 2012
Model Yachts and Footsore Sailors, Marion Pearson, The San Francisco Sunday Call, October 06, 1912

Model boat organizations
Model Yacht Club